Continente Perduto (a.k.a. Lost Continent and Continent Perdu) is a 1955 Italian documentary film about Maritime Southeast Asia including Borneo.

Awards
It has received the following awards:
 1955 Cannes Film Festival: Special Jury Prize
 5th Berlin International Film Festival: Big Silver Medal (Documentaries and Culture Films)

Legacy

French literary critic Roland Barthes dedicates an essay to the film in his semiological work, Mythologies. He criticizes the filmmakers as perpetuating a European sense of exoticism, while also imposing their own Christian values onto the Buddhist traditions of the region.

References

External links

Der verlorene Kontinent (Film) - German wikipedia version

1955 films
CinemaScope films
1950s Italian-language films
Italian documentary films
Films scored by Angelo Francesco Lavagnino
1955 documentary films
1950s Italian films